The men's 90 kg weightlifting competitions at the 1960 Summer Olympics in Rome took place on 9 September at the Palazzetto dello Sport. It was the third appearance of the middle heavyweight class.

Results

References

Weightlifting at the 1960 Summer Olympics